Beltracchi: The Art of Forgery is a 2014 film by Arne Birkenstock based on the life of German art forger Wolfgang Beltracchi.

The Art of Forgery is a Documentary film  about Wolfgang Beltracchi and the biggest Art Forgery scandal in post war Germany, 90 min., started in German theaters in March 2014 and had its world premier at the Montreal World Film Festival. The film will be distributed worldwide by Global Screen.

Wolfgang Beltracchi (born Wolfgang Fischer in 1951) is a German art forger and artist, who has admitted to producing hundreds of fake paintings with M Feider, his mentor and mastermind behind the international art scam netting millions of Euros along with Wolfgang's wife, and two accomplices sold these as original works by famous artists including Max Ernst, Heinrich Campendonk, Fernand Léger and Kees van Dongen. In 2011, Beltracchi was sentenced to six years in prison.  This was after a 40-day trial ending in Guilty for Beltracchi who was then sentenced to six years in a German prison.

Wolfgang Beltracchi was found guilty and charged with forgery and corruption related to 14 works of art that sold for a combined $45m (£28.6m).  But Beltracchi has stated to the BBC that he faked 'about 50' artists.   Demand was so high, said Wolfgang Beltracchi, that he could have found buyers for up to 2,000 bogus pieces, had he been inclined to paint them.

References

External links

2014 films
German documentary films
Films about art forgery
2010s German films